Épernay is a commune in the Marne department of northern France, 130 km north-east of Paris on the mainline railway to Strasbourg. The town sits on the left bank of the Marne at the extremity of the Cubry valley which crosses it.

Épernay is a sub-prefecture of the department and seat of an arrondissement.

History
Épernay belonged to the archbishops of Reims from the 5th until the 10th century, when it came into the possession of the counts of Champagne. It was badly damaged during the Hundred Years' War, and was burned by Francis I in 1544. It resisted Henry of Navarre in 1592, and Marshal Biron fell in the attack which preceded its eventual capture. In 1642 it was, along with Château-Thierry, named as a duchy and assigned to the duc de Bouillon.

Population

Main sights
In the central and oldest quarter of the town, the streets are narrow and irregular; the surrounding suburbs, however, are modern and more spacious, with La Folie to the East, for example, containing many villas belonging to rich wine merchants. The town has also spread to the right bank of the Marne.

One of its churches retains a portal and stained-glass windows from the sixteenth century, but the other public buildings are of modern construction. The most famous street in Épernay is the Avenue de Champagne which features the leading Champagne manufacturers.

Other sights outside the town include:

Château de Pierry
Château de Montmort
Château de Condé

Economy

Épernay is best known as the principal "entrepôt" for champagne wines, which are bottled and kept in large cellars built into the chalk rock on which the town is built. The major grape varieties used in champagne are the pinot noir, the pinot meunier and the chardonnay. The production of the equipment and raw materials used in the champagne industry is a major source of local employment. Champagne Pannier, among others, was established in Épernay before moving to Château-Thierry in 1937. Brewing and sugar refinery and the production of hats and caps, are also major industries.

Épernay station has rail connections to Paris, Strasbourg, Reims, Metz, Nancy and several regional destinations.

Notable people
Épernay was the birthplace of:
Flodoard (894–966), chronicler
Maakan Tounkara, handball player
Henri-Gustave Joly de Lotbinière, Québécois politician
Gabrielle Dorziat, comedian
Yohann Diniz, athlete
John Gadret, cyclist
Léon Homo (1872–1957), historian
Jean-Baptiste-Maximien Parchappe de Vinay (1800–1866), psychiatrist
Alex Vanopslagh, Danish politician

Épernay was the final resting place of:
Léon Azéma (1888–1978), French architect, died in Épernay and is buried in the cemetery there.
Yvette Lundy (1916–2019), member of the French Resistance.

Twin towns — sister cities

Épernay is twinned with:

 Ettlingen, Germany
 Clevedon, England, United Kingdom
 Fada N'gourma, Burkina Faso
 Middelkerke, Belgium
 Montespertoli, Italy

See also
French wine
Champagne Riots

References

External links

Official website (in French)

Communes of Marne (department)
Subprefectures in France
Champagne (province)